The First Cabinet of J.B.M. Hertzog was the executive power in South Africa from June 1924 to June 1929. It was also known as the pact government, due to the inclusion of at least two members of the Labour Party in a coalition.

Cabinet

Sources

Government of South Africa
Executive branch of the government of South Africa
Cabinets of South Africa
1924 establishments in South Africa
1929 disestablishments in South Africa
Cabinets established in 1924
Cabinets disestablished in 1929